Jean Kahwaji (born 1953) is a former Lebanese military officer and Commander of the Lebanese Armed Forces from 2008 to 2017.

Career
Kahwaji joined the Lebanese army in 1973. He trained abroad, especially in the United States and Italy. He also underwent anti-terrorism training in Germany in 2006, as well as in Italy. He headed the army's 12th Infantry Brigade since 2002.. He also went to the Swedish military school in Boden Garrison in Sweden for terrain warfare during the 1990s.

On 30 August 2008, the Lebanese government appointed Brigadier-General Jean Kahwaji to be chief of the Lebanese Armed Forces, replacing Michel Suleiman, who became President of Lebanon in May 2008. He is the 13th chief officer in all of the army's 63-year history.

Corruption charges 
Kahwaji has been charged several times with corruption and illicit enrichment. As an army official, Kahwaji is suspected of using his influence to accrue vast fortunes, and accepting bribes. On December 2020, a lebanese judge has filed corruption charges against him and other high-ranked officials.

Murder enquiry

On 24th January 2023, Judge Tarek Bitar charged Kahwaji and the former Prime Minister - Hassan Diab - with 'Homicide with intent' under the probe into the Beirut explosion in 2020. Judge Bitar also charged Prosecutor General Ghassan Oweidat - the head of Lebanon's domestic intelligence agency Major General Abbas Ibrahim and other current and former security and judicial officials.

Personal life
Jean Kahwaji is married to Marleine Sfeir. They have three children: Jad, Joanna and Joe.
He is a Maronite Christian.

See also
Lebanese Armed Forces
Lebanese Civil War
2nd Infantry Brigade (Lebanon)
12th Infantry Brigade (Lebanon)

References

Living people
1953 births
Lebanese Maronites
Lebanese military personnel
People from Bint Jbeil District